Bayard Tuckerman (2 July 1855 New York City - 20 October 1923) was a United States biographer and historian. He was the son of Lucius Tuckerman an iron manufacturer and Elizabeth Wolcott Gibbs Tuckerman.

Biography
He studied for two years in Neuchâtel, Switzerland, at the Pension Roulet, and later graduated from Harvard in 1878, and became a writer on historical and literary subjects. He lectured on English literature for Princeton University 1898-1907. He married Annie Osgood Smith in 1882; they had four children, among whom was Bayard Tuckerman Jr., a noted jockey.

Works
 History of English Prose Fiction (New York, 1882)
 Life of General Lafayette (1889)
 The Diary of Philip Hone (1889)
 William Jay and the Constitutional Movement for the Abolition of Slavery (1894)
 Life of General Philip Schuyler'' (1903)

Notes

References

External links

 

1855 births
1923 deaths
American non-fiction writers
Harvard University alumni